Paul Andrew Stewart (born 7 October 1964) is an English former professional footballer who played as a defensive midfielder and forward.

He notably played top flight football for Manchester City, Tottenham Hotspur, Liverpool and Sunderland, with appearances in the Premier League with The Reds and the Black Cats. Whilst with Spurs he scored their first goal in the 1991 FA Cup final and was awarded man of the match as his team lifted the trophy. He also played in the Football League at Blackpool, Crystal Palace, Wolverhampton Wanderers, Burnley and Stoke City. He retired in 2000 following a two-year spell with non-league side Workington. He was capped three times at senior level for England and also played at U21 and B Team level.

Club career

Blackpool
Stewart started his career as an apprentice with Blackpool, turning professional in October 1981. He made his debut for the Seasiders in a home draw with Rochdale on 10 February 1982. For the remainder of the season, he alternated between midfield and forward. It wasn't until Sam Ellis became manager that Stewart found his true role, at centre-forward. In his final season (1986–87) with the Tangerines, he notched-up 21 goals and helped Mark Taylor net fourteen.

Manchester City
After over 200 first team appearances, he joined Manchester City in March 1987 for a fee of £200,000, then a welcomed record for hard-up Blackpool, but he was unable to keep City in the First Division. On 7 November 1987 he was one of three players, the others being David White and Tony Adcock to score a hat-trick in a 10–1 victory over Huddersfield Town in the Second Division.

Tottenham Hotspur
In total that season, he scored 24 goals for City, but was unable to get them promoted. Terry Venables signed him in June 1988 for Tottenham Hotspur, paying £1.7million (a portion of which went to his first club, Blackpool). At the time it was one of the highest fees paid by an English club, and the highest for a Second Division player.

Stewart made his debut for Spurs on 1 October 1988, as a substitute in a 2–2 draw at home to Manchester United, missing a stoppage time penalty. Bought as a striker and scoring 12 goals in his first league season at White Hart Lane, when his goals dried up, he was successfully converted to a midfield role. This came about during a match with Luton at White Hart Lane in December 1990, with Spurs losing Nayim and Pat van den Hauwe to red cards (and Luton being down to ten men), he dropped back and was the most influential player in the match, scoring both goals in a 2–1 win. He was part of a Tottenham midfield which also included Nayim, Paul Gascoigne and Paul Allen, backing up the strikeforce of Gary Lineker and Paul Walsh.

On 5 January 1991, Stewart returned to Bloomfield Road when Tottenham beat Blackpool 1–0 in the Third Round of the FA Cup. It was the only time Stewart faced his first club. He would go on to score Spurs' first goal in the 1991 FA Cup Final win against Nottingham Forest, and was generally regarded as the Man of the Match.

Liverpool
After speculation over the summer of 1992 that he would sign for Manchester United or return to Manchester City, Stewart was transferred to Liverpool in July 1992 for £2.3million, but injuries and lack of form plagued his time at Anfield. He became their second striker to Ian Rush after Dean Saunders was sold to Aston Villa in September, but managed just one league goal (against Sheffield United on his Anfield debut) from 24 games as Liverpool spent most of the season struggling in the new Premier League before finishing sixth. On a rare positive note at Anfield, he scored twice for the Reds in their European Cup Winners' Cup first round first leg victory over Apollon Limassol on 16 September 1992. A proposed second spell with Manchester City, who expressed an interest in re-signing him in July 1993, never took place.

He played just eight league games in 1993–94 as new arrival Nigel Clough and then rising star Robbie Fowler took his place alongside Rush, and went out on loan to Crystal Palace, helping them return to the Premier League at the first attempt as Division One champions. He never played for Liverpool after the 1993–94 season, although he remained contracted to the club (and assigned the number 8 squad number for another season until it went to Stan Collymore) until March 1996. Stewart scored just three goals during his spell at Liverpool.

Later career
He had loan spells at Crystal Palace (January 1994), Wolverhampton Wanderers (September 1994), Burnley (February 1995) and Sunderland (August–November 1995), before joining Sunderland on a free transfer in March 1996 and helped them win promotion to the Premier League as Division One champions. He was unable to keep them in the Premier League and after their relegation he signed for Stoke City. Stewart's spell at Stoke City was not a successful one as he played 25 times in 1997–98 scoring three goals and ended with Stoke suffering relegation to the third tier.

Stewart then signed for non-league side Workington, scoring 15 goals in 55 games over two years, and helping them win promotion from the North West Counties League in his first season, before retiring from playing completely at the end of the 1999–00 season with Workington re-established in the Northern Premier League First Division. Stewart remains one of the very few players to have the distinction of playing in a north London derby, a Manchester derby, a Merseyside derby and a Northeast derby.

International career
Stewart played for England at England under-21 and B before being capped three times in the early 1990s for the senior side under Graham Taylor.

Personal life
Stewart was inducted into the Hall of Fame at Bloomfield Road, when it was officially opened by former Blackpool player Jimmy Armfield in April 2006. Organised by the Blackpool Supporters Association, Blackpool fans around the world voted on their all-time heroes. Five players from each decade are inducted; Stewart is in the 1980s.

In November 2016, Stewart said that he was a victim of child sexual abuse when he was playing youth football.

Stewart released his autobiography in August 2017, titled, Damaged.

Career statistics
Source:

A.  The "Other" column constitutes appearances and goals in the Anglo-Italian Cup, Football League Trophy, Full Members Cup and UEFA Cup Winners' Cup.

Honours

Club
Tottenham Hotspur
FA Cup: 1990–91

Workington 
North West Counties League First Division Champions – 1998–99

Individual
PFA Team of the Year: 1987–88 Second Division
Blackpool Hall of Fame Inductee

References

Further reading

External links
 LFCHistory.net profile
 Stewart in the Blackpool Supporters Association Hall of Fame
 

1964 births
Living people
English footballers
Blackpool F.C. players
Manchester City F.C. players
Tottenham Hotspur F.C. players
Liverpool F.C. players
England under-21 international footballers
England international footballers
England B international footballers
Crystal Palace F.C. players
Wolverhampton Wanderers F.C. players
Burnley F.C. players
Sunderland A.F.C. players
Stoke City F.C. players
Workington A.F.C. players
Footballers from Manchester
People from Poulton-le-Fylde
Premier League players
English Football League players
Association football forwards
FA Cup Final players
English autobiographers